Brother Fish is a novel written by Bryce Courtenay that was published in 2004.

Plot summary
Brother Fish is a story spanning four continents and eighty years, though the bulk of the narrative takes place in Australia and Korea. The book deals with the friendship of Jacko McKenzie, a native of the (fictional) Queen's Island in the Bass Strait, and James ‘Jimmy’ Pentecost Oldcorn, an orphaned American ex-soldier. The two have been meeting at the Gallipoli Bar of the ANZAC Hotel, Launceston, Tasmania for 33 years, ever since their release from a prisoner of war camp in Korea.

In the bar, Jacko reminisces about his youth on Queen's Island, ruminates on the poverty he experienced as the son of a fisherman and a washerwoman, and recalls the inhabitants of his hometown. One of the defining points of Jacko's life was his first encounter with Miss Nicole Lenoir-Jourdan, the town librarian and indomitable justice of the peace. The librarian substantially influenced Jacko's life, first as a teacher giving additional English lessons during his formative years, later as a friend, and ultimately as a business partner.

A key feature of the novel is Jacko's recounting of his army days, first as an infantryman who enlisted too late to see any service in World War II and then as an infantryman in Korea. It was during this time that Jacko met Jimmy, an American soldier, and care is taken to delve into the background of the latter.

Following their release, the two men return to Queen's Island, where Jimmy is a big hit with the local girls. During a brief stopover in Launceston, Jacko meets Wendy, the daughter of a local doctor and ex-fiancé of one of Jacko's fallen comrades, and the two eventually marry. As Jacko and Jimmy set about rebuilding their lives and starting their own fishing business, they turn to the domineering Miss Lenoir-Jourdan once more. Her chequered past as a Russian émigré, first to Shanghai and later to Australia via Hong Kong following a dramatic fallout with a Chinese Triad boss, is described in detail, and ultimately rounds out the novel.

The story concludes with Jimmy and Jacko enjoying their pint in the ANZAC before travelling to say their final goodbyes to an old, dear friend on his deathbed.

Major themes 
The Korean War is a major theme of the first third of the book - in particular, its status as "the forgotten war", the poor performance of American troops, the brutality of the South Korean regime of Syngman Rhee, and the crimes against POWs.

Another common theme throughout the novel is music, specifically the mouth organ, which Jacko and his family are rather adept at playing. Jimmy repeatedly reminds Jacko that this music possibly saved both of them from near-certain death in Korea.

The novel explores the White Australia policy by way of the obstacles Jimmy encounters trying to secure permanent residency in Australia. In a similar vein, references appear throughout the book to Australia's racist history and its treatment of the aboriginal population as second-class citizens.

2004 novels
Novels by Bryce Courtenay
Novels set in Australia